Sandur (meaning sandy beach) is a village on the south coast of the island of Sandoy in the Faroe Islands. The Sandur hoard of silver coins, dating to the end of the 11th century, attests to the long history of the village. In January 2020 the population stood at 532.

The Municipality of Sandur consists of the village of Sandur only. It is the most populous place on the "Sand Island", and is situated on a peninsula between the lakes of Gróthúsvatn in the northwest and Sandsvatn in the northeast, facing the inlets of Grótvík and Sandsvágur in the south.

History
Sandur is an old site of the thing where every year the local Várting was held. Excavations here have unearthed a stave church from the 11th century, where today there is a typical Faroese wooden church with grass roof. In 1988 the modern church suffered a devastating fire in which all of the church's silver melted. The fire turned out to be arson. In the following year the church was restored, just in time for its 150th anniversary.

In 1863 while extending the churchyard a treasure of silver was found consisting of 98 coins from the 11th century, half of them of German origin. Furthermore in 1989 archaeologists discovered a pagan burial ground from the times of Viking occupation. The burial included the well-preserved skeleton of a woman from the Faroe Islands in a grave 150 cm long. The grave also included three beads of amber, a blue glass bead, and a knife.

In the open-air museum of the Danish national museum close to Copenhagen one can see a water-mill which originally, in the 18th century, was installed in Sandur. The local museum Sands Bygdasavn is open in summer. It displays objects of everyday life belonging to the ancestors of the local inhabitants.

Transport and tourism
Sandur can be reached from Tórshavn via the ferry ports Gamlarætt and Skopun. From there along the lake Sandsvatn on Road 30 to Sandur. All villages on the island can be reached by bus from Sandur. They are therefore suitable for day trips. Due to the topography of the island walking-tours are suitable for casual strolling and cyclists. Popular trips are to Søltuvík on the west coast, Skarvanes in the south (with slightly more demanding hiking) and Húsavík on the east coast.

The small passenger only ferry MV Sildberin departs Sandur for Skúvoy, an island to the south. Particularly interesting is the tour in the Faroese rowboat Hvíthamar from Sandur to the bird rocks on the west coast or to Skúvoy. Boatbuilder Jóan Petur Clementsen himself is rowing.

The campsite á Munkinum is one of the camping sites on Sandoy. The other two camping sites are in Húsavík and Dalur. In addition Sandsvatn and Gróthúsvatn are attractive places for fishing. The Hotel Ísansgarður has been reconstructed. The tourist information in Sandur provides up-to-date information on private accommodation and holiday homes.

Climate

Sands Listasavn Art Museum
The Art Museum of Sandur is open from May to October every day except for Monday from 14:00-16:00. In wintertime it is open Sundays from 14:00-16:00. The museum and the art works in it were a present from Sofus Olsen. It was built in 2005 and handed over to the municipality of Sandur in December 2005, on Mr Olsen's 92nd birthday.

Sport
Sandur is best known for its football club, B71 Sandoy, which has enjoyed modest success in both the Faroe Islands Premier League and UEFA.

Gallery

See also

 List of towns in the Faroe Islands
 History of the Faroe Islands
 Sandur hoard

References

External links

 Sandur.fo Municipality of Sandur Official website
 Visitsandoy.fo Visit Sandoy Official tourist information
 Photos from Sandur On Flickr

Municipalities of the Faroe Islands
Populated places in the Faroe Islands
Ports and harbours of the Faroe Islands
Sandoy